Frederick James Beasley (19 December 1880 – 10 March 1964) was an Australian rules footballer who played with Essendon and Geelong in the Victorian Football League (VFL).

Notes

External links 

1880 births
1964 deaths
Australian rules footballers from Victoria (Australia)
Essendon Football Club players
Geelong Football Club players
Australian military personnel of World War I